The Carnegie Classification of Institutions of Higher Education, or simply the Carnegie Classification, is a framework for classifying colleges and universities in the United States. It was created in 1970 by the Carnegie Foundation for the Advancement of Teaching. It is managed by the American Council on Education.

The framework primarily serves educational and research purposes, where it is often important to identify groups of roughly comparable institutions. The classification includes all accredited, degree-granting colleges and universities in the United States that are represented in the National Center for Education Statistics' Integrated Postsecondary Education Data System (IPEDS).

General description
The Carnegie Classification was created by the Carnegie Commission on Higher Education in 1970. The classification was first published in 1973 with updates in 1976, 1987, 1994, 2000, 2005, 2010, 2015, 2018 and 2021. To ensure continuity of the classification framework and to allow comparison across years, the 2015 Classification update retains the same structure of six parallel classifications, initially adopted in 2005. The 2005 report substantially reworked the classification system, based on data from the 2002–2003 and 2003–2004 school years.

In 2015, the Carnegie Foundation transferred responsibility for the Carnegie Classification of Institutions of Higher Education to the Center for Postsecondary Research of the Indiana University School of Education in Bloomington, Indiana. The voluntary Classification on Community Engagement is managed by the Public Purpose Institute at Albion College. In March 2022, the universal and elective Carnegie classifications moved to the nonprofit American Council on Education in Washington, D.C.

Information used in these classifications comes primarily from IPEDS and the College Board.

Basic classification
The number of institutions in each category is indicated in parentheses.

Doctorate-granting Universities
Doctorate-granting Universities are institutions that awarded at least 20 research/scholarly doctorates in 2013–14. Professional doctorates (M.D., J.D., etc.) are not included in this count but were added as a separate criterion in 2018–19. The framework further classifies these universities by their level of research activity, as measured by research expenditures, number of research doctorates awarded, number of research-focused faculty, and other factors. A detailed list of schools can be found in the list of research universities in the United States.

Doctoral Universities – Very High Research Activity (R1) (130)
Doctoral Universities – High Research Activity (R2) (132)
Doctoral/Professional Universities (D/PU) (161)

Master's Colleges and Universities

Master's Colleges and Universities are institutions that "awarded at least 50 master's degrees in 2013–14, but fewer than 20 doctorates."

 Master's Colleges and Universities: Larger programs (M1) are larger programs that awarded at least 200 master's-level degrees  (393)
 Master's Colleges and Universities: Medium programs (M2) are medium programs that awarded 100–199 master's-level degrees (207)
 Master's Colleges and Universities: Smaller programs (M3) are small programs that awarded 50–99 master's-level degrees (141)

Baccalaureate Colleges

Baccalaureate Colleges are institutions where "bachelor's degrees accounted for at least 10 percent of all undergraduate degrees and they awarded fewer than 50 master's degrees (2013–14-degree conferrals)."

Baccalaureate Colleges—Arts & Sciences (249)
Baccalaureate Colleges—Diverse Fields (324)
Baccalaureate/Associate's Colleges: Associates Dominant (149)
Baccalaureate/Associate's Colleges: Mixed Baccalaureate/Associate's (259)

Associates Colleges
Associates Colleges are institutions whose highest degree is the associate degree, or bachelor's degrees account for fewer than 10 percent of all undergraduate degrees (2013–14-degree conferrals).

Associate's Colleges: High Transfer – High Traditional (166)
Associate's Colleges: High Transfer – Mixed Traditional/Nontraditional (127)
Associate's Colleges: High Transfer – High Nontraditional (84)
Associate's Colleges: Mixed Transfer/Career – High Traditional (110)
Associate's Colleges: Mixed Transfer/Career – Mixed Traditional/Nontraditional (102)
Associate's Colleges: Mixed Transfer/Career – High Nontraditional (130)
Associate's Colleges: High Career – High Traditional (87)
Associate's Colleges: High Career – Mixed Traditional/Nontraditional (123)
Associate's Colleges: High Career – High Nontraditional (184)

Special Focus Institutions
Special Focus Institutions were classified "based on the concentration of degrees in a single field or set of related fields, at both undergraduate and graduate levels. Institutions were determined to have a special focus with concentrations of at least 80 percent of undergraduate and graduate degrees. In some cases this percentage criterion was relaxed if an institution identified a special focus on the College Board's Annual Survey of Colleges, or if an institution's only accreditation was from a body related to the special focus categories".

Special Focus Two-Year: Health Professions (267)
Special Focus Two-Year: Technical Professions (62)
Special Focus Two-Year: Arts and Design (41)
Special Focus Two-Year: Other Fields (74)
Special Focus Four-Year: Faith-Related Institutions (310)
Special Focus Four-Year: Medical Schools and Centers (54)
Special Focus Four-Year: Other Health Professions Schools (261)
Special Focus Four-Year: Engineering Schools (7)
Special Focus Four-Year: Other Technology-Related Schools (70)
Special Focus Four-Year: Business and Management Schools (94)
Special Focus Four-Year: Arts, Music, and Design Schools (137)
Special Focus Four-Year: Law Schools (36)
Special Focus Four-Year: Other Special Focus Institutions (36)

Tribal Colleges
Tribal Colleges are institutions that belong to the American Indian Higher Education Consortium.

Tribal colleges and universities (Tribal) (35)

Not classified
The Basic Classification omits 26 institutions.

Undergraduate instructional program
The Undergraduate Instructional Program classification combines (a) the ratio of Arts and sciences and professional fields (as defined in the Classification of Instructional Programs (CIP)) and (b) the coexistence of programs at the undergraduate and graduate levels (again using the CIP).

Arts and sciences and professional fields
The framework categorizes institutions based on the proportion of undergraduate majors in arts and sciences or professional fields, based on their two-digit CIP.

 Associates Only (Assoc) only award associate degrees.
 Associates Dominant (Assoc-Dom) award some bachelor's degrees, but award more associates's degrees.
 Arts & Sciences Focus (A&S-F) award least 80 percent of undergraduate degrees in the arts and sciences.
 Arts & Sciences + Professions (A&S+Prof) award between 80 and 59 percent of undergraduate degrees in the arts and sciences.
 Balanced Arts & Sciences/Professions (Bal) award 41 to 59 percent of undergraduate degrees in each domain.
 Professions + Arts & Sciences (Prof+A&S) award between 80 and 59 percent of undergraduate degrees in a professional field.
 Professions Focus (Prof-F) award at least 80 percent of undergraduate degrees in a professional field.

Graduate coexistence
The framework categorizes institutions based on the proportion of undergraduate and graduate programs (defined by their 4-digit CIP) that coexist.

 No coexistence (NGC)—no programs coexist.
 Some coexistence (SGC)—some graduate programs coexist with undergraduate programs but fewer than half.
 High coexistence (HGC)—at least half of the graduate programs coexist with undergraduate programs.

Graduate instructional program
The Graduate Instructional Program classification indicates (a) if the institution awards just master's degrees or master's degrees and doctoral degrees, and (b) in what general categories they  predominantly award graduate degrees. Institutions that do not award graduate degrees are not classified by this scheme.

Postbaccalaureate graduate programs
Institutions that offer graduate and professional programs (such as law schools) but do not award the doctorate are classified as having Postbaccalaureate graduate programs. These programs are classified by the fields in which the degrees are awarded.

Single postbaccalaureate (education) (S-PostBac/Ed)—only offer graduate training in education.Single postbaccalaureate (business) (S-PostBac/Bus)—only offer graduate training in business.Single postbaccalaureate (other field) (S-PostBac/Other)—only offer graduate training in a field other than education or business.Postbaccalaureate comprehensive (PostBac-Comp)—offer graduate training in the humanities, social sciences, Science, Technology, Engineering, and Medicine (STEM), and one or more professional fields.Postbaccalaureate, arts & sciences dominant (PostBac-A&S)—only offer graduate training in the arts and sciences.Postbaccalaureate with arts & sciences (education dominant) (PostBac-A&S/Ed)—offer graduate training primarily in the arts and sciences with some training in education.Postbaccalaureate with arts & sciences (business dominant) (PostBac-A&S/Bus)—offer graduate training primarily in the arts and sciences with some training in business.Postbaccalaureate with arts & sciences (other dominant fields) (PostBac-A&S/Other)—offer graduate training primarily in the arts and sciences with some training in a field other than education or business.Postbaccalaureate professional (education dominant) (PostBac-Prof/Ed)—offer graduate training primarily in professional fields with some training in education.Postbaccalaureate professional (business dominant) (PostBac-Prof/Bus)—offer graduate training primarily in professional fields with some training in business.Postbaccalaureate professional (other dominant fields) (PostBac-Prof/Other)—offer graduate training primarily in professional fields with some training in a field other than education or business.

Doctoral degree programs
Institutions that offer doctoral degrees, including medical and veterinary degrees, are classified by the field in which they award degrees.Single doctoral (education) (S-Doc/Ed) only award doctoral degrees in education.Single doctoral (other field) (S-Doc/Other) only award doctoral degrees in a single non-education field.Comprehensive doctoral with medical/veterinary (CompDoc/MedVet) (a) award doctorates in the humanities, social sciences, and STEM fields, (b) graduate or professional degrees in one or more professional fields, and (c) award medical or veterinary doctoral degrees.Comprehensive doctoral (no medical/veterinary) (CompDoc/NMedVet) (a) award doctorates in the humanities, social sciences, and STEM fields, (b) graduate or professional degrees in one or more professional fields, and (c) do not award medical or veterinary doctoral degrees.Doctoral, humanities/social sciences dominant (Doc/HSS) award most of their doctorates in the humanities and social sciences.Doctoral, STEM dominant (Doc/STEM) award most of their doctorates in STEM fields.Doctoral, professional dominant (Doc/Prof) award most of their doctorates are awarded in professional fields other than engineering.

Enrollment profile
The Enrollment Profile of institutions are classified according to (a) the level of the highest degree awarded and (b) the ratio of undergraduate to graduate students.Exclusively undergraduate two-year (ExU2)—students are not awarded bachelor's or higher degrees.Exclusively undergraduate four-year (ExU4)—students are only awarded bachelor's degrees.Very high undergraduate (VHU)—fewer than 10 percent of students are graduate students.High undergraduate (HU)—more than 10 percent, but fewer than 25 percent of students are graduate students.Majority undergraduate (MU)—more than 24 percent, but fewer than 50 percent of students are graduate students.Majority graduate/professional (MGP)—fewer than 50 percent of students are undergraduates.Exclusively graduate/professional (ExGP)—students are only awarded degrees higher than bachelor's.

Undergraduate profile
The framework classifies institutions' Undergraduate Profile according to (a) the proportion of part-time undergraduate students to full-time students, (b) the institutions selectivity in admitting undergraduate students, and (c) the percentage of students who transfer into the university.

Enrollment status
The framework classifies Enrollment Status according to the ratio of part-time to full-time students (degree seeking students in four-year institutions).PT2: Higher part-time two-year—more than 60 percent of students at this 2-year institution are part-time.Mix2: Mixed part/full-time two-year—between 39 and 60 percent of students at this 2-year institution are part-time.MFT2: Medium full-time two-year—more than 60 but fewer than 91 percent of students at this 2-year institution are full-time.FT2: Higher full-time two-year—more than 90 percent of students at this 2-year institution are full-time.PT4: Higher part-time four-year—more than 39 percent of students at this 4-year or higher institution are part-time.MFT4: Medium full-time four-year—more than 60 percent but fewer than 80 percent of students at this 4-year or higher institution are full-time.FT4: Full-time four-year—more than 79 percent of students at this 4-year or higher institution are full-time.

Achievement characteristics/selectivitySelectivity is classified according to the SAT and ACT scores of first-time first-year students. This classification only applies to four-year or higher institutions.  As of the 2010 edition the criteria were as follows (http://classifications.carnegiefoundation.org/methodology/ugrad_profile.php)Inclusive (I)—students had a 25th percentile ACT-equivalent score below 18.Selective (S)—students had a 25th percentile ACT-equivalent score from 18 to 21.More Selective (MS)—students had a 25th percentile ACT-equivalent score greater than 21.

Transfer originTransfer origin characterizes the percentage of students who transfer to the institution, and only applies to four-year or higher institutions.Lower transfer-in (LTI)—fewer than 20 percent of students transfer into the institution.Higher transfer-in (HTI)—more than 19 percent of students transfer into the institution.

Size and settingSize and Setting classifies institutions according to (a) size of their student body and (b) percentage of student who reside on campus. This does not apply to exclusively graduate and professional institutions and special-focus institutions.

Size
The size of institutions is based on their full-time equivalent (FTE) enrollment. FTEs are calculated by adding the number of full-time students to one-third the number of part-time students.  Two-year colleges are classified using a different scale than four-year and higher institutions.Very small two-year (VS2)—fewer than 500 FTEs attend this two-year institution.Small two-year (S2)—at least 500 but fewer than 2000 FTEs attend this two-year institution.Medium two-year (M2)—at least 2000 but fewer than 5000 FTEs attend this two-year institution.Large two-year (L2)—at least 5000 but fewer than 10000 FTEs attend this two-year institution.Very large two-year (VL2)—10000 or more FTEs attend this two-year institution.Very small four-year (VS4)—fewer than 1000 FTEs attend this four-year institution.Small four-year (S4)—at least 1000 but fewer than 3000 FTEs attend this four-year institution.Medium four-year (M4)—at least 3000 but fewer than 10000 FTEs attend this four-year institution.Large four-year (L4)—more than 10000 FTEs attend this four-year institution.

SettingSetting is based on the percentage of full-time undergraduates who live in institutionally-managed housing. Two-year institutions are not classified by setting.Primarily nonresidential (NR)—fewer than 25 percent of degree-seeking undergraduates or fewer than 50 percent enrolled full-time live on campus.Primarily residential (R): (a)—at least 25 percent of degree-seeking undergraduates live on campus and (b) at least 50 percent but fewer than 80 percent attend full-time.Highly residential (HR)—at least half of degree-seeking undergraduates live on campus and at least 80 percent attend full-time.

2005 edition
In contrast to previous classifications, the 2005 classification scheme provides a "...set of multiple, parallel classifications." According to Alexander C. McCormick, Senior Scholar at The Carnegie Foundation for the Advancement of Teaching and director of the classifications project, "The five new classifications are organized around three central questions: 1) What is taught, 2) to whom, and 3) in what setting?" In addition to the new classification categories, the previously used classification scheme ("Basic classification") has been revised.

The Carnegie Foundation is also developing one or more voluntary classification schemes that rely on data submitted by institutions. The first focuses on outreach and community engagement, and the second on "...how institutions seek to analyze, understand, and improve undergraduate education."

The Carnegie Foundation has no plans to issue printed editions of the classifications. Their website has several tools that let researchers and administrators view classifications.

Revisions in the basic classification
The "basic classification" is an update of the original classification scheme. In addition to changing names of some categories, the 2005 revision differs from previous editions in that it:

 Splits Associates colleges into subcategories. This is based on the work of Stephen Katsinas, Vincent Lacey, and David Hardy at the University of Alabama and is an update of work funded in the 1990s by the Ford Foundation.
 Categorizes doctorate-granting institutions according to their level of research activity. This level is calculated using multiple measures, financial and otherwise.
 Simplifies the measurement of doctorate degrees awarded.
 Divides Master's colleges and universities into three categories based on the number of Master's degrees awarded.
 Deprecates "Liberal Arts" terminology.
 Modified the criteria separating Master's and Baccalaureate institutions. Institutions formerly classified as Master's Colleges and Universities are now classified as Baccalaureate Colleges.
 Requires institutions to have higher levels of single-field or related-field concentration for designation as special-focus institutions and utilizes more sources of information to identify special-focus institutions.
 Splits the "Schools of engineering and technology" category into two categories and eliminates the "Teacher's colleges" category.
 Measures and classifies service academies using to the same criteria as other institutions.

Previous editions
Prior to the 2000 edition, the Carnegie Foundation categorized doctorate-granting institutions according to the amount of federal funding they received.  The 2005 edition categorizes doctoral-institutions according to their research support but uses a more complex formula than used in previous editions.  Despite the fact that it is no longer used by the Carnegie Foundation, the descriptor Research I'' is still commonly used in reference to universities with the largest research budgets, often by the institutions themselves in their promotional materials.

See also
Association of American Universities
List of research universities in the United States

References

External links
 

Academia in the United States
Educational classification systems
Higher education in the United States
Works about academia
1973 establishments in New Jersey